The Tahai Ceremonial Complex is an archaeological site on Rapa Nui (Easter Island) in Chilean Polynesia. Restored in 1974 by American archaeologist William Mulloy, Tahai comprises three principal ahu from north to south: Ko Te Riku (with restored eyes), Tahai, and Vai Ure. Visible in the distance from Tahai are two restored ahu at Hanga Kio'e, projects that Mulloy undertook in 1972. Like other Mulloy restoration projects at Ahu Akivi, the ceremonial village of Orongo and Vinapu, the ceremonial center at Tahai now constitutes an integral part of the Rapa Nui National Park, designated by UNESCO as a World Heritage site.

William Mulloy and Emily Ross Mulloy are buried at Tahai.

References
 Mulloy, W.T., and S.R. Fischer. 1993. Easter Island Studies: Contributions to the History of Rapanui in Memory of William T. Mulloy. Oxford: Oxbow Books.
 Mulloy, W.T., World Monuments Fund, and Easter Island Foundation. 1995. The Easter Island Bulletins of William Mulloy. New York; Houston: World Monuments Fund; Easter Island Foundation.
 Norwegian Archaeological Expedition to Easter Island and the East Pacific, T. Heyerdahl, E.N. Ferdon, W.T. Mulloy, A. Skjølsvold, C.S. Smith. 1961. Archaeology of Easter Island. Stockholm; Santa Fe, N.M.: Forum Pub. House; distributed by The School of American Research.

External links

 Easter Island Foundation
 William Mulloy Library
 Father Sebastian Englert Anthropology Museum

Easter Island ahu
Archaeological sites in Chile
Archaeological sites in Easter Island
1974 establishments in Easter Island